Ampor Tevi (born July 17, 1970) is a Cambodian actress active in 1990s. Within the span of her career she has starred in numerous films, from movies to musical skits. Her career started in 1988 with her paired actor Sam Vityea. After Sam Vityea died that year, Ampor Tevi was often paired with fellow actor, also famous at the time, Tep Rindaro.

Biography
Ampor Tevi was born in 1970. She is the eldest child in the family among five other siblings. She finished the 12th Grade at Bak Touk College of Fine Arts in 1989. Her debut film was released in 1988 co-starring Sam Vityea, her ex co-star. She then married Pich Phirun who was also an actor from her generation in October 1992.

Career
After marriage, Tevi continued to act for more movies mostly with her co-star Tep Rindaro. Remarkably, her popularity went from just a regular movie star to a super movie star in just a few years. Every new movie released locally and overseas Ampor Tevi was a part of, and she was always the main character of the movie or music video. Everybody began to know her mostly as a playful and pretty young girl.

Cambodia was not completely peaceful in early 1990s. Wars were still going on in some places in the country. Over all Cambodian population were still very poor and needy, so Khmer entertainment productions and performing arts were not in Cambodians' minds at the time. Khmer movies were mostly sold overseas to few Cambodians who fled the country in early 1980s. Khmer cinematography and film productions were very primitive. So, Khmer movie productions were not sophisticated enough to compete with foreign movies from Thailand, India and Hong Kong. Local Cambodians would watch Thai, Indian or Chinese movies rather than Khmer movies. Only Cambodians who lived overseas watched Khmer movies or music videos because they missed Cambodia and that was the only way they could see Cambodia. That had adversely affected local Khmer film productions dramatically that most of Khmer movie production companies had to go out of business or stopped producing movies. By 1994, due to the governments demand, the fairly new Cambodian film industry came once again to an end leaving most actors like Ampor Tevi herself starring in karaoke videos up until the early 2000s. Despite of her popularity, Ampor Tevi had very few opportunities to act and began to lose her concentration. In 2001 Fai Sam Ang, the predominant movie director decided to create the well-known Khmer folktale story: Kone Puos Keng Kong (The Snake King's Child). Ampor Tevi was selected to act as Neang Ni, the main female character of the movie together with Tep Rindaro, Pich Chan Boremei and Winai Kraibutr a Thai leading actor who was also part of the movie. After the filming of Kone Puos Keng Kong, Ampor Tevi decided to leave Cambodia for USA, seeking for a better opportunity. Kon Pous King Kang was the last movie of her career.

Partial filmography

References
Angkorthom

1970 births
Cambodian film actresses
Living people
20th-century Cambodian actresses
21st-century Cambodian actresses